Stram is a surname. Notable people with the surname include:

 Hank Stram (1923–2005), American football coach
 Henry Stram (born 1954), American actor and singer, son of Hank Stram